The 2005 NAB AFL Under-18 Championships was the 10th edition of the AFL Under 18 Championships. Eight teams competed in the championships: Vic Metro, Vic Country, South Australia and Western Australia in Division 1, and New South Wales/Australian Capital Territory (NSW/ACT), Northern Territory, Queensland and Tasmania in Division 2. The competition was played over three rounds across two divisions. Vic Metro and Tasmania were the Division 1 and Division 2 champions, respectively. The Larke Medal (for the best player in Division 1) was awarded to Victoria Metro's Marc Murphy, and the Hunter Harrison Medal (for the best player in Division 2) was won by Tasmania's Grant Birchall.

Results

Division 1

Division 1 Ladder

Division 2

Division 2 Ladder

Under-18 All-Australian team
The 2005 Under-18 All-Australian team was named on 4 July 2005:

For the first time, the Under-18 All-Australian side was named in position to give balance and recognition to players that played terrific roles in defence, as well as players who were creative up forward, so it was not just a midfielders' side. It recognised players across the ground for their performance they put in throughout the Under 18 Championships.

The 2005 Under-18 All-Australian team selectors were: Kevin Sheehan (AFL Talent Manager), Alan McConnell (AIS-AFL High Performance Coach), James Fantasia (Adelaide Recruiting Manager), Kinnear Beatson (Brisbane Lions Recruiting Manager), Neville Stibbard (Kangaroos Recruiting Manager), Francis Jackson (Richmond Recruiting Officer)

References

Under 18